Daugavgrīva White Church is a Lutheran church in the Vecmīlgrāvis district of Riga, the capital of Latvia. It is a parish church of the Evangelical Lutheran Church of Latvia. The church is situated at the address 50 Baltāsbaznīcas iela.

History
The church was built at the very end of the eighteenth century, although there was probably an earlier church on the site. Its name "white church" is derived from its white-painted wooden construction. Situated beside the river, closer to the sea than Riga city centre, it was for many years considered "the fishermen's church". Local tradition suggests that the tower was built to serve also as a lighthouse, although no evidence supports the claim; it is more likely simply to have been used by seafarers as a fixed point of reference for navigation.

External links
 Church website

References 

Churches in Riga